Cirkus Buster is a 1961 Danish movie directed by Erik Balling. The film is based on a TV show with the same name.

Cast
 Buster Larsen as Cirkusdirektør and the clown Buster
 Helle Virkner as Jasmine
 Viggo Brodthagen as him self
 Ole Wisborg
 Palle Huld
 Tommy Kenter 
 Karl Stegger 
 Inger Stender
 Mogens Brandt

References

External links

1961 films
Danish comedy-drama films
1960s Danish-language films
Films directed by Erik Balling